Yvan Stringer is a professor emeritus of economics at HEC Montreal, retired since 2005. He holds an L.Sc.comm, D.E.S. in applied economics from HEC Montreal and a Ph.D. in economics from York University.

Stringer was the director of the Institute of Applied Economics at HEC Montreal. He was also business manager of L'Actualité économique at HEC Montreal.

Publications
 
 
 
 
 

Canadian economists
Living people
HEC Montréal alumni
Academic staff of HEC Montréal
York University alumni
Year of birth missing (living people)